Melnica may refer to:
Melnica, Čaška, North Macedonia
Melnica, Prilep, North Macedonia
Melnica (Petrovac), Serbia